Harry Riley "Ginger" Lees (1905-1982) was a former international motorcycle speedway rider who rode in the first ever Speedway World Championship final in 1936. He was born in Bury, England.

Career summary 

Lees also raced in the first recognised speedway meeting held in Manchester on 3 March 1928. When the league competitions started he joined Burnley. He then moved onto Liverpool in 1930. In 1931 Lees moved onto Preston and wes selected to ride for England against Australia in the third test match at Wembley. He impressed so much that he was signed up to ride for the Wembley Lions in 1932 when he won the inaugural National League.

Lees was a regular England rider until 1934, the year he finished third in the Star Riders' Championship, the forerunner of the Speedway World Championship. He also qualified for the finals of the World Championship in 1936 and 1937, before he retired at the end of 1937.

Lees also appeared in the 1933 British film Money for Speed which starred John Loder, Ida Lupino, Cyril McLaglen and Moore Marriott. Lionel van Praag, Frank Varey and speedway promoter Johnnie Hoskins also featured.

World Final appearances 
 1936 -  London, Wembley Stadium - 15th - 11pts
 1937 -  London, Wembley Stadium - 5th - 19pts

Players cigarette cards
Lees is listed as number 28 of 50 in the 1930s Player's cigarette card collection.

References

1905 births
British speedway riders
Wembley Lions riders
1982 deaths
Sportspeople from Bury, Greater Manchester